Campylocheta townsendi is a species of bristle fly in the family Tachinidae.

Distribution
United States.

References

Dexiinae
Insects described in 1916
Diptera of North America